The Financial News Network (FNN) was an American financial and business news television network that was launched November 30, 1981. The purpose of the network was to broadcast programming nationwide, five days a week for seven hours a day on thirteen stations, in an effort to expand the availability of business news for public dissemination. FNN was founded by Glen H. Taylor, a former minister of the Christian Church from 1950—1956, and producer of films for the California Department of Education. The channel was purchased by NBC in February 1991, and operations were integrated with rival cable financial news network, CNBC, on May 21, 1991.

Early history

Founding

Financial News Network (FNN) was founded in 1981 by Glen Taylor, chairman of the newly created five-member Board of Directors. Other board members included Karen Tyler, Head of Production, Rob Fisher, VP Business Affairs, and Rodney Buchser (who had been general manager of independent station KWHY-TV in Los Angeles. The concept originated in the late 1960s as Quotron (a quotation ticker vendor) supported WCIU Chicago and KWHY with the initial limited 'ticker scroll'. In 1969, Registered Investment Advisor Eugene Inger, joined Channel 22, and expanded financial television in Los Angeles with reporting, analysis and broader coverage. Inger expanded service to the San Francisco area in 1970 on KOFY, Channel 20. He also provided financial TV programming to KDNL in St. Louis, and pioneered WKID Channel 51 serving South Florida. During this time, FNN began programming on Channel 18 in Los Angeles in competition with Inger and KWHY.

Later, in 1975 via Newark, New Jersey-based WBTB (later WWHT)-TV (channel 68, now UniMás owned-and-operated station WFUT-DT), an independent station – owned at the time by Blonder-Tongue Broadcasting – which served the New York City market, was 'dark'. Inger revived the station by investing in Channel 68, and served as General Manager, as well as hosting a daily Wall Street programming block on WBTB (then titled Stock Market Today during market hours and Wall Street Perspective in the evening) starting in the fall of 1975. Keith Houser, the station's assistant general manager, worked with vendors to facilitate the ticker tape crawl across the bottom of the screen with a delay (mistakenly attributed at a 2 hour delay in a TV Guide reference), as was required at the time. The ticker ran across the lower third of the screen, with stock prices on the top (white) band and index prices on the bottom (blue) band. After the first year of programming, the SEC permitted just a twenty-minute delay. The concept was well-established both by WCIU Chicago, KWHY Los Angeles, Inger's day-long market coverage in Miami/Fort Lauderdale. (The 'specialty programming' did not encounter regulatory hurdles TV Guide suggested.) During the years, FNN also grew affiliates that generally not overlapping Inger's targeted markets. However, Inger eventually
"affiliated" with FNN, via an arrangement that took some programming and data feed from FNN, while retaining local coverage and interviews hosted on his station(s). The Chicago and Los Angeles stations evolved independently.

KWHY was the first television station on the West Coast to offer daily market news accompanied by a digital stock ticker "crawl" at the bottom of the screen, followed by WCIU in Chicago, KEMO in San Francisco, and FNN on Los Angeles channel 18. All this allowed stock traders and investors to be able to stay on top of market action without subscribing to an expensive stock quotation service. Computers at that time could not keep up with the full stock feed and as such, the ticker could only show pre-selected stocks, making the system highly manual and clumsy. (The first fully automated stock ticker to appear on television would not be developed until 1996, for now-defunct upstart CNNfn.) Those were custom developments. Gene Inger's approach was simpler: take a feed from Reuters or UPI (both at times did contract to provide data feeds) and split-screen a camera shooting the tapes, with studio programming on the top portion. Inger was independent and never had a personal or corporate role with FNN, aside from limited mutual program affiliation later. Inger did however, become an original Market Maven contributor to CNBC, which effectively absorbed all financial programming over time; with competition years later from Bloomberg Television (which became the direct successor of FNN) and Fox Business Channel. (Inger continued as a guest on CNBC for years; and provides a daily market analysis report online, continuing active as of 2019.)

With the earlier launch of CNN by Ted Turner blazing the trail (Inger did provide the original stock market commentary to Ted Turner's WTBS Channel 17 Atlanta, WRET-TV [later WPCQ, now WCNC] Charlotte and Hubbard's Channel 44 Tampa); and subsequent to a 1975 TV Guide article about Gene Inger's programming success in New York, Taylor and Buchser realized that newly available technology made possible the marriage of KWHY / Inger-style live market reporting with on-screen quotes and the concept of national news via satellite. The early history of FNN was not highly profitable and, within a few years, Buchser severed his relationship with the fledgling network to launch a financial marketing services firm called FMS Direct. In its early years, FMS Direct produced infomercials and direct response television spots which more often than not, ran on FNN, the network he had helped to found. Harvey "Scott" Ellsworth, who was the creator and on-air host of the popular radio program Scott's Place, which aired on Los Angeles radio station KFI from 1967 until 1974, was one of FNN's initial anchors.

Private financing
FNN received its early private financing from Biotech Capital Corporation, which later changed its name to Infotechnology, Inc. Biotech Capital was also one of the few publicly held "Business Development Companies" - governed by the Business Company Development Act of 1980.

In 1981, shortly before its initial public offering, led by the Paulson Investment Company, Taylor, then the Chairman, resigned due to previous legal difficulties.  Jeremy Wiesen, a professor of business accounting and entrepreneurship at the Stern School of Business, New York University, and formerly with the Securities and Exchange Commission, became Chairman.  The network's principal audience were small investors.

FNN's principal studio was in Santa Monica, California, but it then established operations in New York, on the ground floor of Merrill Lynch's headquarters in Manhattan, where passersby could view its broadcast operations.  Merrill Lynch was one of the initial private investors in FNN.

Over-the-air affiliates
At first, the channel aired only during daytime hours on a mix of broadcast stations and cable television providers.  Over-the-air affiliates included:
KSCI, Los Angeles (now a ShopHQ affiliate)
WATL, Atlanta (now a MyNetworkTV affiliate)
WPWR-TV, Chicago (now a MyNetworkTV affiliate)
 KJTV (now KCIT), Amarillo (now a Fox affiliate)
 KNXV, Phoenix (now an ABC affiliate)
 WSWS, Columbus, Georgia (now Antenna TV affiliate WGBP-TV)
 KTWS (now KDFI), Dallas (now a MyNetworkTV affiliate)
 WKID (now WSCV), Miami/Ft. Lauderdale (now Telemundo)
 WWSG-TV, Philadelphia (now CW O&O WPSG); replaced in late 1982 by WRBV-TV, Vineland, NJ (now Univision-owned WUVP)
WCCO-TV, Minneapolis (now a CBS owned-and-operated station)
 KSTS-TV 48 San Jose, CA (now a Telemundo O&O)
 WWHT (now WFUT), Newark, NJ
 WGGT (now WMYV), Greensboro, NC
 WRHT (now WPXD), Detroit
 KDNL-TV, St. Louis (now an ABC affiliate)
 WGNO, New Orleans (now an ABC affiliate)
 WBTI-TV (now WSTR-TV), Cincinnati (now a MyNetworkTV affiliate)
 WQTV (now WBPX), Boston
 KSTW, Seattle (now a CW O&O)
 WNUV-TV, Baltimore (now a CW affiliate)
 WCQR (now WDCW), Washington, D.C. (now a CW affiliate) (WCQR received its feed from WNUV via microwave, with local insertion provided at WNUV)
 WPTT-TV (now WPNT), Pittsburgh (now a MyNetworkTV affiliate)
 KAUT-TV, Oklahoma City
 WSTG-TV (now WNAC-TV), Providence (now a Fox affiliate)
 KGCT-TV (now KMYT-TV), Tulsa (now a MyNetworkTV affiliate)
 KIDY, San Angelo (now a Fox affiliate)
 WDDD (now WTCT), Marion, IL (now a TCT affiliate)
 WRLH-TV, Richmond (now a Fox affiliate)
 WLJC-TV, Lexington (now a religious station)
 KZAZ-TV (now KMSB), Tucson (now a Fox affiliate)
 WZTV, Nashville (now a Fox affiliate)
 KSTU, Salt Lake City (now a Fox affiliate)
 WTTO, Birmingham (now a CW affiliate)
 WTSG-TV (now WFXL), Albany, GA (now a Fox affiliate)
 WRIP, Chattanooga (now WDSI-TV, a This TV affiliate)
 KUSI-TV, San Diego
 WXXA-TV, Albany, NY (now a Fox affiliate)
 KECH (now KPXG-TV), Portland, OR (now an Ion Television affiliate)
 WWMA-TV (now WXMI), Grand Rapids, MI (now a Fox affiliate)

SCORE
In 1985, FNN severed ties with its broadcast stations and established a 24-hour cable-exclusive feed. At night, it began offering the Cable Sports Network, a venture between the Mizlou Television Network and Tom Ficara; this was subsequently replaced by SCORE, a mini-network that aired sports events and news. Also airing in the overnight hours was Venture, a series of long-form speeches by business leaders, and TelShop, a shop-at-home service.

In the late 1980s, Infotechnology Inc., the New York-based information technology and venture capital company (chaired by Earl Brian) which also owned United Press International, increased its position to 47 percent, and remained one of FNN's largest shareholders until Earl Brian, the CEO of UPI and FNN, was later convicted on fraud charges specific to UPI and FNN.  At its height, FNN was available on 3,500 cable systems, reaching a potential audience of 35 million homes across the country.  FNN moved into newly built modern TV studios and production facilities in the Wang building in Los Angeles and in New York's Rockefeller Center.

Later history

Financial scandals and accounting disputes
In 1990—only months after beginning its biggest advertising campaign ever—FNN fell prey to two of the main topics of its broadcasts, a financial scandal and an accounting dispute.  During that year's audit, the network's auditor, Deloitte & Touche, discovered irregularities on the part of its chief financial officer, C. Steven Bolen.  The irregularities were serious enough that Deloitte said its 1989 audit couldn't be relied upon.  FNN launched an internal investigation and discovered what it called evidence of unauthorized payments that Bolen made to himself.  Bolen was fired in October.  In addition, Deloitte wanted FNN to report a $28 million investment into a data system for brokers as an expense.  FNN claimed that this would push its balance sheet so far into the red that it would violate some covenants with its banks, as well as force a default on its line of credit.  FNN replaced Deloitte with Coopers & Lybrand, and reported a $72.5 million loss for fiscal 1990.  Needing a major cash infusion to stay in business, FNN put itself up for sale in November.

Proposed merger with CNBC
In February 1991, FNN reached a handshake agreement with a partnership of Dow Jones & Company and Westinghouse Broadcasting (Group W) for $90 million. However, just a few days later, FNN agreed to an unexpected $105 million offer from NBC, owner of FNN's then two-year-old rival, CNBC. NBC had encountered problems getting cable systems to carry CNBC, and intended to merge CNBC with FNN (at the time, CNBC was only in 17 million homes). However, matters were complicated in March when FNN filed for Chapter 11 bankruptcy, triggering a lively bidding war for the network.

Group W and Dow Jones raised their offer to $115 million, only to be turned down on a technicality by Bankruptcy Court Judge Francis Conrad; Dow Jones and Group W refused to keep the bidding open until May 31, 1991. NBC then raised its offer to $115 million, which was accepted by Conrad.  That decision, however, was overturned on appeal.

Group W/Dow Jones and CNBC both significantly raised their bids. Group W/Dow Jones offered $167 million, while CNBC offered $154 million.  However, the CNBC bid included more cash, and the Dow Jones/Group W bid included payments that were tied to revenue targets over three years.  Conrad awarded FNN to CNBC, feeling its deal was more realistic.

Closure
FNN ceased operations at 6:00 p.m. Eastern Time on May 21, 1991. CNBC immediately took over FNN's satellite transponder space, more than doubling its audience at one stroke, and branded its business day programming as "CNBC/FNN Daytime" until 1992; CNBC also effectively adopted the "look", news style of FNN as well as incorporated features of FNN's ticker into its own on-screen stock ticker. While most of FNN's employees were laid off as a consequence of the merger (and eventually hired by Bloomberg L.P. to become the employees of Bloomberg Television which was launched three years later and took over FNN's channel space), a select number of FNN anchors and reporters (including Bill Griffeth, Ron Insana, Allan Chernoff and Joe Kernen) were retained by CNBC. (Sue Herera, who joined FNN at age 21 and very soon became an anchor, moved to NBC and the brand-new CNBC prior to the demise of FNN; Griffeth and Herera were later reunited at CNBC and co-anchored Power Lunch until 2011.)(Note: original pioneer Gene Inger did not become involved with FNN beyond affiliation on his stations; and did become an 'original Market Maven' frequent guest on CNBC. Inger declined staying with CNBC, having semi-retired to Florida; and remained a guest -usually with Mark Haines or Bill Griffeth- including the first remote fiber uplink to 30 Roc commentaries from Fort Lauderdale to CNBC. As of 2022 Inger continues to provide online daily market analysis.)

See also
 CNBC – successor in interest to the Financial News Network
 Bloomberg Television - took over the channel space of Financial News Network and hiring most of former FNN workforce
 LiveWire Professional – MS-DOS software for conversion of Financial News Network stock market ticker to computer readable format

References

CNBC
Defunct television networks in the United States
Television channels and stations established in 1981
Business-related television channels
Television channels and stations disestablished in 1991
English-language television stations in the United States
Business mass media in the United States